Yaroslava Vyacheslavovna Shvedova (born 12 September 1987) is a Kazakhstani former professional tennis player. Before 2008, she represented her country of birth, Russia.

She won one singles title and 13 doubles titles on the WTA Tour, plus one singles and one doubles title on WTA 125 tournaments, as well as four singles and three doubles titles on the ITF Circuit. On 29 October 2012, she reached her best singles ranking of world No. 25. On 22 February 2016, she peaked at No. 3 in the doubles rankings.

Shvedova made three major singles quarterfinals: at the 2010 and the 2012 French Open, and also at the 2016 Wimbledon Championships. She won two Grand Slam women's doubles titles, at the 2010 Wimbledon Championships and the 2010 US Open, partnering American player Vania King in both. Shvedova is also one of only seven players to record a golden set in the Open era. She achieved this feat 2012 at Wimbledon in her match against Sara Errani, the only time a golden set was recorded in a Grand Slam championship.

Career

2006–2008: Grand Slam debut, maiden WTA title, top 100
In February 2007, she unexpectedly reached the final of the Bangalore Open, beating home-crowd favourite and No. 2 seed Sania Mirza in the quarterfinals. In the final, she defeated top-seeded defending champion Mara Santangelo in straight sets, to win her first WTA Tour title. This win caused her to be in the top 100 for the first time, at 78.

At the 2007 Miami Open, she came through qualifying and impressively recorded her first-ever top 20 win over future No. 1, Ana Ivanovic, in the second round, beating her in two sets. However, Tathiana Garbin beat her in the third round.

In August 2008, she won an ITF Circuit title in Monterrey, Mexico, defeating Magdaléna Rybáriková in the final in two sets. Just over a week later, she won through the qualifying rounds for US Open, but lost to Agnieszka Radwańska in the first round.

2009: French Open and US Open third rounds

In 2009, Shvedova qualified for the main draw at Roland Garros, defeating Americans Shenay Perry in the first qualifying round and Angela Haynes in the second. She then beat Elena Baltacha in the final qualifying round to enter the main draw. She beat Kaia Kanepi and advanced to the third round after defeating Arantxa Rus, also a qualifier. There, she lost in a close three-sets match to former world No. 1, Maria Sharapova, returning from a long-lasting shoulder injury and then ranked 102.

At Wimbledon, she faced Monica Niculescu in the first round and defeated her with the loss of just one game, but lost to American teenager Melanie Oudin in the second. At the US Open, Shvedova pulled off the biggest win of her career by beating then No. 5 Jelena Janković in three sets, in a match where she saved two match points.

2010: Two major doubles titles & one singles QF
Shvedova experienced a good run at the Miami Open. She gained direct entry into the main draw and won a tight first-round match against wildcard Ajla Tomljanović. She then defeated 23rd seed Sabine Lisicki in the second round after she retired whilst trailing 3–6, 1–0. In the third round, Shvedova advanced against unseeded Andrea Petkovic by winning another close match. She fell to sixth seed Agnieszka Radwańska in the fourth round, in straight sets.

At the Barcelona Open, Shvedova defeated Anabel Medina Garrigues in the first round before upsetting fourth-seeded Maria Kirilenko in the second. Next, she defeated Iveta Benešová, before falling to eventual tournament and the eventual French Open champion Francesca Schiavone in the semifinals.

Shvedova enjoyed arguably her best career result at the French Open. There, she advanced to the quarterfinals in the singles competition. She defeated eighth seed Agnieszka Radwańska, avenging her loss to her in Miami, en route to the quarterfinals. As the last unseeded player in the tournament, Shvedova was defeated by fourth seed Jelena Janković in the quarterfinal. In mixed doubles, she partnered with Julian Knowle to reach the final, beating doubles legends Cara Black and Leander Paes, the second seeds, along the way. They fell in a close final to sixth seeds Katarina Srebotnik and Nenad Zimonjić.

At the Wimbledon Championships, Shvedova entered the doubles competition unseeded with partner Vania King. The two began playing together at the start of the grass-court season two weeks before, and were only in their third event together. In a stunning string of upsets, Shvedova and King won the tournament, beating Elena Vesnina and Vera Zvonareva (who themselves beat Serena and Venus Williams in the quarterfinals) in the final.

Both Shvedova and King continued their good form onto the hardcourts of the US Open. Seeded sixth, the team continued to win match after match, before taking a spot in their second consecutive major final, this time facing Liezel Huber and Nadia Petrova. King and Shvedova won in three sets; the match was played over two days due to heavy rainfall.

2011

Shvedova began her season representing Kazakhstan at the Hopman Cup. She lost her first match to Ana Ivanovic in two sets. During her match against Ivanovic, Shvedova injured her right knee which caused her to pull out of the Hopman Cup. Shvedova also missed the Australian Open due to the same right knee injury.

She returned from injury in February to play at Dubai where she lost in the first round to Zhang Shuai. She went to play at the Qatar Open; seeded fifth for qualifying, she was defeated in the first round by wildcard Elena Vesnina. In March, she travelled to Indian Wells where she lost in the first round to Kimiko Date-Krumm. At the Miami Open, after beating Sara Errani Shvedova retired in her second-round match against 28th seed Jarmila Groth due to a left thigh muscle strain.

She began her clay-court season in Morocco at the Rabat Grand Prix. Seeded second, she was defeated in the second round by Anastasia Pivovarova. At the Barcelona Open, Shvedova lost in the second round to sixth seed and eventual champion Roberta Vinci. Playing at the Madrid Open, Shvedova lost in the first round to 10th seed Agnieszka Radwańska. At the Italian Open, she lost in the first round to qualifier Anastasia Rodionova in straight sets. In doubles, she and Vania King reached the final where they lost to Peng Shuai and Zheng Jie, also in straight sets. Shvedova entered the French Open ranked No. 54 and lost in the first round to 14th seed Anastasia Pavlyuchenkova. As a result of not defending her quarterfinalist points from the previous year, her ranking dropped to No. 115. In doubles, she and her regular doubles partner, Vania King, reached the semifinals where they fell to eventual champions Andrea Hlaváčková/Lucie Hradecká in two sets.

Shvedova began grass-court season at the Birmingham Classic seeded 11th, and lost in the second round to Marina Erakovic. At the Eastbourne International, she lost in the first round of qualifying to Mirjana Lučić-Baroni. Ranked world No. 123 at Wimbledon, she was easily defeated in the first round by qualifier Tamarine Tanasugarn.

Shvedova began wearing prescription sports glasses, after seeking medical advice about a nervous tic in one eye.

She started her US Open Series at the Washington Open and was defeated in the first round by sixth seed Elena Baltacha. In doubles, Shvedova and Sania Mirza won the title defeating Olga Govortsova/Alla Kudryavtseva in the final. Ranked world No. 143 at the Vancouver Open, Shvedova lost in the first round to seventh seed Stéphanie Dubois. She then played at the Bronx Open where she reached the second round and lost to Romina Oprandi, after retiring early in the second set. Due to her ranking of 212, Shvedova had to play qualifying in order to make it into the main draw of the US Open. She lost in the first round of qualifying to Ekaterina Bychkova in two tie-breakers. In doubles, she and Vania King were the defending champions; they reached the final for a second year in a row but lost to Liezel Huber and Lisa Raymond.

Seeded eighth for qualifying at the Korea Open, Shvedova qualified for the main draw beating wildcard Choi Ji-hee, Han Sung-hee, and third seed Rika Fujiwara. In the first round, she upset Tamarine Tanasugarn. In the second round, Shvedova retired after losing the first set 6–7 to fourth seed Dominika Cibulková. She qualified for the Japan Women's Open, defeating sixth seed Kristina Mladenovic, wildcard Risa Ozaki, and Hsieh Su-wei. Shvedova was defeated in the second round by seventh seed Chanelle Scheepers. In doubles, she and Vania King advanced to the final where they lost to Date-Krumm/Zhang. Shvedova played her final tournament of the year at the Taipei Ladies Open. She reached the quarterfinals but lost to eighth seed Chang Kai-chen, in straight sets.

Shvedova ended the year as No. 206, her lowest year-end singles ranking since 2005. She also won four WTA Tour doubles titles. Her decline in form in singles was explained by a knee injury that required surgery.

2012

Shvedova started the year playing qualifying at the Australian Open. She lost in the first round of qualifying to Bibiane Schoofs in a marathon three-set match.

She then rebounded, qualifying into the main draw at Copa Colsanitas defeating Raluca Olaru and Leticia Costas. In the main draw, Shvedova reached the quarterfinals where she fell to Tímea Babos. Receiving a wildcard to play at the Monterrey Open, she beat countrywoman Sesil Karatantcheva in the first round. She lost to Mandy Minella in the second round in three sets. At the Abierto Mexicano, Shvedova retired due to a left thigh injury in the final round of qualifying to top seed Edina Gallovits-Hall. Seeded fourth at the $25K event in Irapuato, she reached the final where she lost to sixth seed Kiki Bertens. Shvedova continued her rise in form at another $25K event in Poza Rica, where she won the title beating Monica Puig in the final.

Shvedova started her clay-court season by playing qualifying at the Charleston Open. Seeded 20th for qualifying, she qualified for the main draw defeating Jessica Pegula and tenth seed Andrea Hlaváčková. In the main draw, she reached the third round after defeating Alexandra Panova and 12th seed Yanina Wickmayer. In the third round, she lost to sixth seed Sabine Lisicki. Seeded seventh for qualifying at the Rabat Grand Prix, Shvedova lost in the second round of qualifying to Bianca Botto. At the Portugal Open, Shvedova was defeated in the first round of qualifying by Bianca Botto. Due to having a low ranking, Shvedova played qualifying at the French Open. She qualified into the main draw beating Ajla Tomljanović, CoCo Vandeweghe, and Elena Bogdan. In the main draw, she defeated Mandy Minella, Sofia Arvidsson, and Carla Suárez Navarro in the first three rounds. In the fourth round, she upset seventh seed and defending champion Li Na, 3–6, 6–2, 6–0 to advance to her second French Open quarterfinal. This was Shvedova's biggest win of her career in singles. She lost to fourth seed and reigning Wimbledon champion, Petra Kvitová, in the quarterfinals only in three sets. Due to making the quarterfinals at the French Open, Shvedova's ranking went from 142 to 62. In doubles, she and Vania King reached the quarterfinals where they lost to seventh seeds and eventual finalists Maria Kirilenko/Nadia Petrova.

On 15 June 2012, Shvedova and her partner, Sania Mirza, made a shock first-round exit from the Birmingham Classic; they lost to Iveta Benešová/Alla Kudryavtseva in two sets. At the Wimbledon Championships, Shvedova received a wildcard into the main draw. There, she defeated Chanelle Scheepers and Kiki Bertens to reach the third round where she faced tenth seed Sara Errani and won the fourth "Golden Set" in the history of tennis. She won all 24 points in the fifteen-minute-long first set, blasting 14 winners and making no unforced errors before losing the first point of the second set to break the sequence. She went on to win the match in straight sets 6–0, 6–4 reaching the second week of Wimbledon for the first time. In the fourth round, she was defeated by sixth seed and eventual champion Serena Williams.

Representing Kazakhstan at the 2012 London Olympics, she reached the second round of the women's singles where she lost to 15th seed Sabine Lisicki. In doubles, she reached the second round with partner Galina Voskoboeva.

As the top seed for qualifying at the Cincinnati Open, Shvedova qualified for the main draw beating wildcard Lauren Davis and 14th seed Anna Tatishvili. She beat 16th seed Lucie Šafářová in the first round. In the second round, Shvedova was up against qualifier Urszula Radwańska and won the first set 6–4; Urszula was leading 4–1 in the second set when Shvedova retired due to heat illness. At the Texas Tennis Open, Shvedova lost in the first round in a tough three set match to second seed and eventual finalist Jelena Janković. Ranked 45 at the US Open, Shvedova was defeated in the second round by 20th seed and eventual quarterfinalist Roberta Vinci.

At the Pan Pacific Open, Shvedova lost in the first round to 2010 French Open champion Francesca Schiavone. At the China Open, Shvedova faced 12th seed Dominika Cibulková in the first round. Shvedova won the first set 6–4 and was leading 4–1 in the second set when Cibulková retired due to a left hip injury. In the second round, she was defeated by Peng Shuai. Seeded fifth at Osaka, she lost in the first round to wildcard Tamarine Tanasugarn. Shvedova played her final tournament of the year at the Kremlin Cup. She beat Anastasia Pavlyuchenkova but in the second round, she was defeated by seventh seed Maria Kirilenko.

Shvedova ended the year ranked 29 in singles and 26 in doubles.

2013
 
Shvedova began her year at the Auckland Open. Seeded sixth, she defeated Lara Arruabarrena in the first round, but lost in the second round to Elena Vesnina. In doubles, Shvedova and her partner Julia Görges both reached the final, but they lost to Cara Black/Anastasia Rodionova. Seeded fourth at the Hobart International, Shvedova was defeated in the second round to eventual champion Elena Vesnina. Seeded 28th at the Australian Open, Shvedova lost in the first round to Annika Beck.

Seeded second at the first edition of the Brasil Tennis Cup, Shvedova was defeated in the first round by Melinda Czink in three sets. However, in doubles, she and her partner Medina Garrigues won the title defeating Anne Keothavong/Valeria Savinykh in the final. Seeded 31st at the Indian Wells Open, Shvedova got a bye into the second round where she lost to qualifier Lesia Tsurenko. At the Miami Open, Shvedova lost in the first round to Zheng Jie.

Shvedova started her clay-court season at the Charleston Open. As the 14th seed, she lost in the first round to qualifier Vania King. At the Porsche Tennis Grand Prix, Shvedova reached the quarterfinals with wins over Roberta Vinci and Carla Suárez Navarro. In the quarterfinals, she lost to third seed Angelique Kerber. Shvedova stunned tenth seed and former world No. 1, Caroline Wozniacki, in the first round at the Madrid Open, 6–2, 6–4. In the second round, she beat Kirsten Flipkens. Shvedova withdrew from her third-round match against wildcard Medina Garrigues due to a right arm injury. Seeded 27th at the French Open, Shvedova had quarterfinalist points to defend from last year. In the first round, she defeated CoCo Vandeweghe. However, she was defeated in the second round by qualifier Paula Ormaechea. As a result of her second-round loss at the French Open, Shvedova failed to defend her quarterfinalist points from last year, and her ranking dropped from 31 to 52.

Ranked 55 at Wimbledon, Shvedova beat Kiki Bertens and then withdrew from her second-round match against 2011 Wimbledon champion, Petra Kvitová, due to an arm injury.

She returned to action at the New Haven Open and retired in the final round of qualifying to fifth seed Stefanie Vögele. Ranked 78 at the US Open, Shvedova reached the third round defeating Olga Puchkova and lucky loser Patricia Mayr-Achleitner. She lost in the third round to world No. 1 and eventual champion, Serena Williams, in straight sets.

Seeded eighth at the Tashkent Open, Shvedova lost in the first round to Vesna Dolonc. In doubles, she and Tímea Babos won the title defeating Mandy Minella/Olga Govortsova in the final. At the Guangzhou International Open, she lost to Zheng Jie in the first round. Seeded seventh at the Ningbo International Open, Shvedova reached the quarterfinals defeating Tímea Babos and wildcard Zheng Saisai. She then lost in the quarterfinals to fourth seed Yvonne Meusburger. Seeded tenth for qualifying at the China Open, Shvedova lost in the second round of qualifying to Sharon Fichman. At the Kremlin Cup, she was defeated in the first round by Elena Vesnina, 6–1, 6–2. Competing at the first edition of the Nanjing Ladies Open, Shvedova lost in the first round to second seed Yanina Wickmayer. She played her final tournament of the year at the Taipei Ladies Open. In the first round, she upset fourth seed Ayumi Morita in the first round. However, in doubles, Shvedova and Caroline Garcia won the title defeating Anna-Lena Friedsam/Alison Van Uytvanck in the final.

Shvedova ended the year ranked 81 in singles and 59 in doubles.

2014

Shvedova began the year at the Brisbane International. As the top seed for qualifying, she lost in the second round of qualifying to Anastasia Rodionova. Seeded 12th in qualifying at the Sydney International, Shvedova was defeated in the final round of qualifying by fifth seed Christina McHale. At the Australian Open, she lost in the first round to 13th seed Sloane Stephens.

At the first edition of the Rio Open, Shvedova lost in the first round to Patricia Mayr-Achleitner. At the Brasil Tennis Cup, Shvedova reached the semifinals with wins over Sílvia Soler Espinosa, Barbora Záhlavová-Strýcová, and sixth seed Alexandra Cadanţu. She lost in the semifinals to second seed Garbiñe Muguruza. In doubles, she and her partner Medina Garrigues won the title defeating Schiavone/Soler Espinosa in the final.

Shvedova, as the third seed, qualified for the Indian Wells Open by beating Magda Linette and 13th seed Kimiko Date-Krumm. In the main draw, she reached the third round defeating Chanelle Scheepers and 24th seed Kaia Kanepi. In the third round, she lost to tenth seed and former world No. 1, Caroline Wozniacki. At the Miami Open, Shvedova defeated 2010 French Open Champion Francesca Schiavone in the first round. In the second round, Shvedova lost to world No. 1 and eventual champion, Serena Williams.

Shvedova began her clay-court season at the Charleston Open. She defeated qualifier Zheng Saisai in the first round but lost in the second round to seventh seed Samantha Stosur. In doubles, she and Medina Garrigues won the title defeating Chan Hao-ching/Chan Yung-jan in the final. At the Portugal Open, Shvedova defeated Karin Knapp in the first round. She lost in the second round to second seed Eugenie Bouchard, 4–6, 2–6. Seeded seventh for qualifying at the Madrid Open, she lost in the first round to Mariana Duque Mariño. Shvedova reached the quarterfinals at the Nürnberger Versicherungscup defeating Patricia Mayr-Achleitner and sixth seed Kurumi Nara. She lost to second seed and eventual champion Eugenie Bouchard in the quarterfinals. Ranked world No. 69 at the French Open, Shvedova won her first-round match over Lauren Davis. In the second round, she lost to wild card Pauline Parmentier.

Shvedova played at the Rosmalen Open, her only grass-court tune-up tournament before Wimbledon. She upset second seed Dominika Cibulková in the first round. In the second round, she defeated in a tight match wild card Michaëlla Krajicek. Shvedova lost in the quarterfinals to eighth seed Klára Koukalová, 2–6, 4–6. At Wimbledon, Shvedova defeated wildcard Kristýna Plíšková in a first-round thriller. In the second round, she beat last year quarterfinalist Kaia Kanepi. In the third round, she faced Madison Keys. Shvedova won the first set 7–6; the second set was tied 6–6 when Keys retired due to a right thigh injury. In the fourth round, Shvedova lost to 19th seed and last year finalist Sabine Lisicki.

Seeded fourth at the Swedish Open, Shvedova was upset in the first round by qualifier Laura Siegemund.

Seeded tenth for qualifying at the Western & Southern Open, she lost in the first round of qualifying to American wildcard Nicole Gibbs. At the US Open, Shvedova lost in the first round to Monica Niculescu.

Shvedova had a first-round loss at the Korea Open to Anna-Lena Friedsam. She played her final tournament of the year at the China Open and was defeated in the first round by Roberta Vinci.

Shvedova ended the year ranked 66.

2015

Shvedova began her 2015 year at the Brisbane International. Getting past qualifying, she beat Sabine Lisicki in the first round. In the second round, she lost to top seed and eventual champion Maria Sharapova. At the Sydney International, Shvedova was defeated in the first round of qualifying by Kateřina Siniaková. In Melbourne at the Australian Open, Shvedova upset 16th seed Lucie Šafářová in a first-round thriller. She then beat Monica Puig in the second round. In the third round, Shvedova lost to 21st seed Peng Shuai.

At the Miami Open, Shvedova was defeated in the first round by Johanna Larsson.

Shvedova began her clay-court season at the Charleston Open. In the first round, she beat Stefanie Vögele. In the second round, Shvedova lost to thirteenth seed Irina-Camelia Begu. Seeded fifth at the Copa Colsanitas, Shvedova reached her first WTA singles final since 2007 defeating Maryna Zanevska, qualifier Sachia Vickery, second seed Monica Puig, and Mariana Duque Mariño. In the final, Shvedova lost to Teliana Pereira. At the Madrid Open, she lost in the first round of qualifying to Sesil Karatantcheva. However, in doubles, she and Casey Dellacqua won the title defeating Muguruza/Suárez Navarro in the final. At the Nürnberger Versicherungscup, Shvedova was defeated in the first round by Kiki Bertens. Ranked 69 at the French Open, she lost in the first round to seventh seed and 2008 champion, Ana Ivanovic. In doubles, she and her partner, Casey Dellacqua, reached the final where they lost to Mattek-Sands/Šafářová.

Shvedova only played one grass-court warm-up tournament before Wimbledon. At the Rosmalen Open, she stunned top seed Eugenie Bouchard in the first round. In the second round, she beat Marina Erakovic. In the quarterfinals, Shvedova was defeated by fifth seed and eventual champion, Camila Giorgi. Ranked 79 at the Wimbledon Championships, Shvedova lost in the first round to Mirjana Lučić-Baroni.

At the Bucharest Open, she lost in the final round of qualifying to Cristina Dinu. In Turkey at the İstanbul Cup, Shvedova lost in the first round to Bojana Jovanovski.

Shvedova began her US Open series at the Rogers Cup. She lost in the second round of qualifying to Monica Puig. At the Western & Southern Open, Shvedova qualified for the main draw defeating Jarmila Gajdošová and Mariana Duque Mariño. In the first round, she upset ninth seed Garbiñe Muguruza. In the second round, she was defeated by Anastasia Pavlyuchenkova. In doubles, she and Dellacqua reached the final but lost to Chan Hao-ching/Chan Yung-jan. Seeded second for qualifying at the US Open, Shvedova lost in the final round of qualifying to Tereza Mrdeža. In doubles, Shvedova and Dellacqua advanced to the final where they were defeated by Hingis/Mirza.

At the Korea Open, Shvedova faced Christina McHale in her first-round match. McHale won the first set 6–4; Shvedova led 2–1 in the second set when she abandoned the match. At the Tashkent Open, Shvedova beat eighth seed Andreea Mitu in the first round. In the second round, she lost to Evgeniya Rodina. At the China Open, Shvedova lost in the final round of qualifying to eighth seed Irina Falconi. After the China Open, Shvedova played for the first time at the Hong Kong Open. She beat Jarmila Gajdošová in the first round. In the second round, she was defeated by eighth seed and doubles partner Alizé Cornet. In doubles, Shvedova and Cornet won the title beating Lara Arruabarrena/Andreja Klepač. Seeded fourth at the first edition of the Hua Hin Championships, Shvedova reached the final defeating wildcard Kamonwan Buayam, qualifier Liu Chang, Duan Yingying, and Wang Qiang. In the final, Shvedova beat Naomi Osaka for her first WTA 125 title. Shvedova played her final tournament of the year at the Taipei Challenger. Seeded second, she made it to the quarterfinals beating Marina Melnikova and Amandine Hesse. In the quarterfinals, Shvedova faced fifth seed Kirsten Flipkens. Shvedova won the first set 6–4; Flipkens was leading 2–1 in the second set when Shvedova pulled out of the tournament.

Shvedova ended the year ranked 82 in singles and No. 6 in doubles.

2016

Shvedova started the year at the Shenzhen Open. Coming through qualifying, she lost in the first round to Anett Kontaveit. At the Sydney International, Shvedova retired during her qualifying first-round match against Sesil Karatantcheva. At the Australian Open, she won her first-round match over Tsvetana Pironkova. In the second round, she lost to 15th seed Madison Keys.

Getting past qualifying at the Dubai Tennis Championships, Shvedova stunned seventh seed Roberta Vinci in the first round, before she was defeated by eventual champion Sara Errani. At the Qatar Open, Shvedova lost in the first round to Nao Hibino. At the Indian Wells Open, she won her first two rounds over qualifier Kristýna Plíšková and 11th seed Lucie Šafářová. In the third round, she was defeated by qualifier Nicole Gibbs. At the Miami Open, Shvedova lost in the final round of qualifying to Kristýna Plíšková. In doubles, she and Tímea Babos reached the final where they lost to Mattek-Sands/Šafářová.

Shvedova started her clay-court season at the Charleston Open where she was defeated in the second round by fifth seed Sara Errani. Playing at the Madrid Open, she lost in the first round of qualifying to Mariana Duque. At the Italian Open, Shvedova was defeated in the first round of qualifying by Ana Konjuh. She played her final tournament before the French Open at Internationaux de Strasbourg and lost in the first round to lucky loser Virginie Razzano. At the French Open, Shvedova was defeated in the first round by 13th seed and 2009 French Open champion Svetlana Kuznetsova.

She began her grass-court season at the Rosmalen Open where she was defeated in the first round by third seed and eventual finalist Kristina Mladenovic. However, in doubles, Shvedova and Oksana Kalashnikova won the title defeating Xenia Knoll and Aleksandra Krunić in the final. Playing at the first edition of the Mallorca Open, Shvedova lost in the first round to Daniela Hantuchová. At the Eastbourne International, she lost in the second round of qualifying to Alison Van Uytvanck. Competing at the Wimbledon Championships, Shvedova reached the quarterfinals in singles for the first time in her career defeating Julia Görges, 17th seed Elina Svitolina, 2013 Wimbledon finalist Sabine Lisicki, and 28th seed Lucie Šafářová. In her quarterfinal match, she lost to eighth seed, five-time Wimbledon champion, and former world No. 1, Venus Williams. In doubles, Shvedova and Tímea Babos reached the final upsetting top seeds Hingis/Mirza en route to the final. In the final, Shvedova and Babos lost to the Williams sisters. Due to her quarterfinals result at Wimbledon, Shvedova's singles ranking improved from 96 to 49.

Seeded seventh at the Swedish Open, Shvedova retired during her first-round match against Mona Barthel due to a mid-back injury. Representing Kazakhstan at the 2016 Rio Olympics, Shvedova lost in the first round to Misaki Doi of Japan. In doubles, she and her compatriot, Galina Voskoboeva, faced Kirsten Flipkens/Yanina Wickmayer in the first round. Flipkens/Wickmayer won the first set 6–1. The match was not continued because Shvedova and Voskoboeva pulled out of the doubles event at the Olympics.

In Cincinnati at the Western & Southern Open, Shvedova lost in the first round of qualifying to Ana Konjuh. At the US Open, Shvedova made it to the fourth round for the first time in her career defeating Lara Arruabarrena, Wang Qiang, and Zhang Shuai. In the fourth round, she was defeated by top seed Serena Williams.

In China at the Wuhan Open, Shvedova reached the third round with wins over wildcard Zheng Saisai and 13th seed Roberta Vinci. She lost in the third round to fourth seed Simona Halep. In Beijing at the China Open, Shvedova advanced to the quarterfinals defeating seventh seed Carla Suárez Navarro, Belinda Bencic, and Alizé Cornet. She lost in her quarterfinal match to third seed and eventual champion, Agnieszka Radwańska. Seeded eighth at her final tournament of the year at the Tianjin Open, Shvedova was defeated in the first round by Naomi Osaka.

She ended the year ranked 33.

2017
Shvedova withdrew from the Shenzhen Open due to a left foot injury. She started at the Sydney International where she lost in the first round of qualifying to Naomi Broady. At the Australian Open, she was defeated in the first round by 27th seed Irina-Camelia Begu.

Competing in Russia at the St. Petersburg Trophy, Shvedova lost in the first round to Russian wildcard Natalia Vikhlyantseva. At Dubai, she was defeated in the first round by Monica Puig. In March, she played at the Indian Wells Open where she lost in the first round to American qualifier Varvara Lepchenko. In Miami, she had her first win of the year when she beat Jelena Janković in the first round. In the second round, she was defeated by 17th seed Anastasia Pavlyuchenkova.

Shvedova started on clay court at the Morocco Open where she was eliminated in the second round by Tatjana Maria. At the Madrid Open, she was defeated in the first round by eighth seed Svetlana Kuznetsova. In Rome, she lost in the first round to ninth seed Venus Williams. Seeded seventh at the Nürnberger Versicherungscup, she retired from her quarterfinal match due to an injury after losing the first set to Misaki Doi. At the French Open, she lost in the first round to fifth seed Elina Svitolina.

Shvedova missed the Wimbledon Championships due to undergoing ankle surgery. As a result of this surgery, she missed the rest of the season.

She ended the year ranked 292.

2020: Comeback
Following surgery and childbirth, Shvedova began her comeback in February at the Dubai Championships. Using a protected ranking, she played doubles alongside Darija Jurak. They lost in the first round to sisters Lyudmyla/Nadiia Kichenok. Shvedova played her first singles match since 2017 at the Qatar Open where she was defeated in the first round by qualifier Laura Siegemund. In doubles, she and Jurak lost in the first round to Russian team of Ekaterina Alexandrova and Anna Blinkova.

In March, she became the first player to face mandated quarantine during the COVID-19 pandemic.

Shvedova didn't play any more matches for the rest of the season. She ended the year without a ranking.

2021: Olympic Games & retirement
Shvedova started her season in Dubai at the first edition of the Abu Dhabi Open and lost in the first round to qualifier Bianca Turati. At the first edition of the Yarra Valley Classic, she was defeated in her first-round match by Vera Lapko. Competing at the Australian Open for the first time since 2017, she fell in the first round to Camila Giorgi.

In March, Shvedova played at the Qatar Open but was eliminated in the second round of qualifying by Bethanie Mattek-Sands. At the Dubai Tennis Championships, she was beaten in the first round by Jessica Pegula. Playing at the Miami Open for the first time since 2017, she again lost in round one, to qualifier Tereza Martincová.

After Miami, Shvedova moved on toward the clay-court season. Playing at the Charleston Open for the first time since 2016, she was defeated in the first round by Misaki Doi. Competing in Madrid for the first time since 2017, she lost her first-round match to Ons Jabeur. At the Italian Open, she scored her first WTA Tour main-draw win since reaching the 2017 Nuremberg quarterfinals with a remarkable victory over Italian wildcard Martina Trevisan. She then was knocked out in the second round by top seed Ashleigh Barty.

Representing Kazakhstan at the Summer Olympics, Shvedova retired during her first-round match against Ajla Tomljanović due to heat illness. In August, at the Cincinnati Open, she lost in the first round of qualifying to Zhang Shuai. At the first edition of the Cleveland Open, she was defeated in the first round of qualifying by Linda Fruhvirtová. And again, at the US Open, she was eliminated in the first round by Jasmine Paolini.

On October 1, 2021, in a ceremony at the Astana Open, Shvedova announced her retirement from tennis. There was a celebration of her career as well.

Playing style
Shvedova is noted for her powerful serve, groundstrokes, and proficient net play. Her favorite serve is the flat serve down the T, her weakness is her consistency on the forehand side.

Personal life
Shvedova was born to Russian father Vyacheslav and Bashkir mother Nurzia, who used to be a professional runner (winner of the International Association of Ultra Runners 100 km World Championships, 1992). Shvedova has one brother. She began playing tennis at age 8 when her father introduced her to the sport in Chernogolovka (Moscow region). Shvedova changed her nationality from Russian to Kazakhstani in 2008 as part of the country's attempts to boost its sporting profile. Shvedova gave birth to twins in October 2018.

Performance timeline

Only main-draw results in WTA Tour, Grand Slam tournaments, Fed Cup/Billie Jean King Cup and Olympic Games are included in win–loss records.

Singles

Doubles

Mixed doubles

Significant finals

Grand Slam finals

Doubles: 6 (2 titles, 4 runner-ups)

Mixed doubles: 1 (runner-up)

Premier Mandatory/Premier 5 finals

Doubles: 5 (2 titles, 3 runner-ups)

WTA career finals

Singles: 2 (1 title, 1 runner-up)

Doubles: 28 (13 titles, 15 runner-ups)

WTA 125 tournament finals

Singles: 1 (title)

Doubles: 2 (1 title, 1 runner-up)

ITF Circuit finals

Singles: 7 (4 titles, 3 runner–ups)

Doubles: 4 (3 titles, 1 runner–up)

Records

Top 10 wins

Notes

References

External links

 
 
 
 
 
 

1987 births
Living people
Asian Games medalists in tennis
Asian Games bronze medalists for Kazakhstan
Bashkir people
Grand Slam (tennis) champions in women's doubles
Hopman Cup competitors
Kazakhstani female tennis players
Kazakhstani people of Russian descent
Medalists at the 2014 Asian Games
Naturalised citizens of Kazakhstan
Naturalised tennis players
Olympic tennis players of Kazakhstan
Russian emigrants to Kazakhstan
Russian female tennis players
Sportspeople from Astana
Tennis players from Moscow
Tennis players at the 2012 Summer Olympics
Tennis players at the 2016 Summer Olympics
Tennis players at the 2014 Asian Games
US Open (tennis) champions
Wimbledon champions
Tennis players at the 2020 Summer Olympics